The Southeastern Anatolia Region is a geographical region of Turkey. The most populous city in the region is Gaziantep. Other big cities are Şanlıurfa, Diyarbakır, Mardin and Adıyaman.

It is bordered by the Mediterranean Region to the west, the Eastern Anatolia Region to the north, Syria to the south, and Iraq to the southeast.

Subdivision 

Middle Euphrates Section
Gaziantep Area
Şanlıurfa Area
 Tigris Section
Diyarbakır Area
Mardin - Midyat Area

Ecoregions

Terrestrial

Palearctic

Temperate broadleaf and mixed forests 

 Eastern Anatolian deciduous forests
 Zagros Mountains forest steppe

Temperate grasslands, savannas and shrublands 

 Eastern Anatolian montane steppe

Mediterranean forests, woodlands, and scrub

 Eastern Mediterranean conifer-sclerophyllous-broadleaf forests

Provinces 
Provinces that are entirely in the Southeastern Anatolia Region:
 Mardin
 Şanlıurfa

Provinces that are mostly in the Southeastern Anatolia Region:
 Adıyaman
 Batman
 Diyarbakır
 Gaziantep
 Siirt

Provinces that are partially in the Southeastern Anatolia Region:
 Bitlis
 Bingöl
 Kahramanmaraş
 Kilis
 Malatya

Geography and climate

Southeastern Anatolia Region has an area of 59,176 km and is the second smallest region of Turkey. Southeastern Anatolia Region has a semi-arid continental climate with very hot and dry summers and cold and often snowy winters.

Tourism
 Tourism information is available in English at the Southeastern Anatolian Promotion Project site.

See also
 Provinces of Turkey
 Upper Mesopotamia
 Fertile Crescent
 Tur Abdin
 Southeastern Anatolia Project

References

External links

 
Regions of Turkey